James Maitland Balfour (5 January 1820 – 23 February 1856) was a Scottish land-owner and businessman. He made a fortune in the 19th-century railway boom, and inherited a significant portion of his father's great wealth.

He was a Conservative Member of Parliament in the 1840s, and was the father of Prime Minister Arthur Balfour, 1st Earl of Balfour.

Life

Balfour was the son of James Balfour (c.1775–1845) and his wife Lady Eleanor, daughter of James Maitland, 8th Earl of Lauderdale. He was educated at Eton and Trinity College, Cambridge.

Balfour inherited his father's neo-classical mansion Whittingehame House and his Highland estate at Strathconan, as well as a house in Grosvenor Square, London.
He also inherited his father's business skills, and became a director of the North British Railway at the height of the railway mania, which earned him a fortune.

Balfour married Lady Blanche Mary Harriet Gascoyne-Cecil, daughter of James Gascoyne-Cecil, 2nd Marquess of Salisbury, on 15 August 1843 (her brother Robert later became Prime Minister of the United Kingdom). They had eight children, five sons and three daughters:

Eleanor Mildred Balfour (1845–1936), who married Henry Sidgwick and was Principal of Newnham College, Cambridge
Evelyn Georgiana Mary Balfour (1846/7–1934), married John William Strutt, 3rd Baron Rayleigh
Arthur James Balfour, 1st Earl of Balfour (1848–1930), Conservative politician and Prime Minister of the United Kingdom from 1902 to 1905
Cecil Charles Balfour (1849–1881)
Alice Blanche Balfour (1850–1936), an entomologist, geneticist, naturalist and scientific illustrator.
Francis Maitland Balfour (1851–1882), Professor of Animal Morphology at the University of Cambridge
Gerald William Balfour, 2nd Earl of Balfour (1853–1945), Conservative politician who served as Chief Secretary for Ireland and President of the Board of Trade
Colonel Eustace James Anthony Balfour (1854–1911), an architect who served as ADC to King Edward VII. His wife Lady Frances Balfour was a leading suffragist.

Balfour died of tuberculosis on 23 February 1856 in Funchal, Madeira, aged 36. Lady Blanche Balfour died in 1872.

References

External links 

1820 births
1856 deaths
People educated at Eton College
Members of the Parliament of the United Kingdom for Scottish constituencies
19th-century deaths from tuberculosis
UK MPs 1841–1847
Tuberculosis deaths in Portugal
British railway entrepreneurs
19th-century Scottish landowners
Alumni of Trinity College, Cambridge
People from Haddington, East Lothian
James Maitland Balfour
Parents of prime ministers of the United Kingdom
19th-century Scottish businesspeople